Sokol District is an administrative district (raion), one of the sixteen in Northern Administrative Okrug of the federal city of Moscow, Russia. The area of the district is   As of the 2010 Census, the total population of the district was 57,133.

History
The district is named after the settlement of Sokol built in the 1920s. Earlier, the village of Vsekhsvyatskoye existed at the same location. During the Red Terror, mass executions of suspected counterrevolutionaries and various political opponents were conducted here at a local cemetery, which is now a memorial complex. In 1938, Sokol metro station opened here.

Sokol in Current Moscow 
Sokol is a very family-oriented place to live. It has 3 parks, multiple top-tier schools and after school activities such as volleyball and music school within walking distance. it is centrally located and is only a 20 minute drive from the center. Sokol also has the very first Moscow music school, named after Dunayevsky.

Municipal status
As a municipal division, it is incorporated as Sokol Municipal Okrug.

Education
Moscow Aviation Institute
Stroganov Moscow State University of Arts and Industry
Moscow State University of Food Production
Moscow University of Industry and Finance

Science and technology
GSKB Almaz-Antey
Hydroproject

Sightseeing

Church of All Saints at Vsekhsvyatskoye (1733–1736)
Memorial park of World War I victims (the former Moscow Brotherly Cemetery)

References

Notes

Sources

Districts of Moscow
Northern Administrative Okrug